Kulei is a traditional Indian village belongs to Angul district of Odisha. Kulei is the 6th most populous village in Samal Barrage sub district of Angul district. The area of the village is 3 km2, making it the 17th largest village in the subdistrict. The population density of Kulei is 516 people per km2. 0.54 km2, (19%) of which is covered with forest.

Talcher is the nearest town to the village and distance from Kulei is 18 km. The village comes under Kulei grama panchayat. District headquarter is Angul which is 40 km away from village. Distance from State capital Bhubaneswar is 143 km. Pincode of village Kulei is 759100.

History
Kulei was an important village of Talcher kingdom during royal empire. The village was a halt after crossing river Brahmani towards Palalahara state towards west and Dhenkanal State towards north of Talcher state. The village is surrounded by Barachala hill (known as Baruan Pahada) and river Brahmani which helped the soldiers of state to prevent external entry of enemy.

Demographics

As of 2011 census, population of village is 1486. Out of which 780 are male and 706 are females. Sex ratio is 905 female per 1000 male in the village. Children aged below 6 years are 202 which is 13.59% of total population of village. There are total 110 male child against 92 girl child. Child sex ratio is 836 which is lower than state average of 941 as per 2011 census.

There are 362 households in the village. 68% of the whole population is general caste, 20% are schedule caste and 12% are schedule Tribe. Total 942 people are literate in the village, among 567 are male and 375 are female. Literacy rate of the village Kulei was 73.36% compared to 72.87% of the state. Male literacy is 84.63% against 61.07% female literacy. Pin Code of Kulei is 759146 which comes under dhenkanal postal division (Sambalpur Region)

Village has 34%(506) population engaged in either main or marginal works.54% of them are male and 12% are female. 38% of male and 7% of female population are full-time worker, whereas 16% of male and 5% of female are part-time workers.

Economy
Village economy is vastly dependent on agriculture, farming and small business. Some peoples are engaged at OPCL (mini hydro plant of 5MW) in the village. Some are servicing for government and private sector industries. Economy is influenced by the industries of the district Angul.

Administration
Kulei village is administrated by Sarpanch, who is elected representative of grama panchayat. Kulei grama panchayat is consist of 9 villages, i.e. Baruan, Bethiabhuin, Dangarabeda, Gadadharpur, Jharana, Katarapada, Kulei, Ratanpur and Tumugola.

Education

There is primary school, Upper primary school and High school available in the village. Anganwadi education for kids is also running by state govt. For college education students are dependent near by cities.

Health
There is a primary health centre available in village and runs by state government. But for major treatment villagers are dependent on Talcher sub divisional hospital.

Sports
The most popular sport of the village is cricket. However football, volleyball, kabadi, kho-kho, satranja, bahuchori, luchakali, etc. are also played in the village.

Festivals and functions
Makara Sankranti and Durga puja (Dushera) are the main festival of village. Pana Sankrati, Mangala puja, Ganesh puja, Saraswati puja, Janmastami, Holi, Deepabali, Kumar Purnima, Bada Osha, Khudurukuni, etc. are also celebrated throughout the year.

Landmark

Kulei is situated on the bank of river Brahmani and shadow of Barachal hill. The statue of lord Hunuman at the entry of village is the landmark for the village. This is the biggest statue of Hanuman in terms of height (30 ft) in Angul district.

Industries
Nearest industries of the village are NTPC Kaniha, MCL, Nalco, FCI, Jindal, Lanco, Bhusan, OPCL, Samal Barrage, etc. Youth of the village are working in these nearby industries.

Place of interest

 Bramhani River
 Baba Kundheswar Temple

 Maa Mangala Temple
 Maa Tarini Temple
 Hanuman Statue
 Maa Santoshi Temple
 Sanidev Temple
 Samal barrage Dam
 OPCL Hydro electricity project

Transport

Rail

Nearest railway station is Talcher which is 18 km away from the village. New railway line between Talcher-Bimlagarh is passing through the village is under construction.

Road
Village is well connected with Bhubaneswar, Cuttack, Rourkela and near by cities with bus service. NH 149 runs through the village and connect with Talcher and Palalahara and joins NH 55 at Banarpal to Cuttack and Bhubaneswar.

Local transport
Villagers use their personal vehicle for local transport. Taxi and auto rickshaw are available on rent for local transport.

Gallery

References

Villages in Angul district